Károly Brocky, or Charles Brocky (Temesvár, 22 May 1808 – London, 8 July 1855) was a Hungarian painter.

He was the son of a hairdresser, who died whilst his son was still young. To gain a living the youth joined a body of strolling actors. After passing through many vicissitudes, he was at length placed in a free drawing school at Vienna, whence he went to Paris, where he studied at the École du Louvre. When about thirty years of age he visited London, where he took up his abode. His first contribution to the Royal Academy was in 1839, and from that time he exhibited portraits, ideal subjects, and miniatures on ivory somewhat frequently; amongst others a 'Nymph ' (in oil) in 1850, and 'Spring,' 'Summer,' 'Autumn,' and 'Winter' in 1852. He died in 1855. A sketch of his life by Norman Wilkinson was published in 1870.

Notes

References
 
Attribution:

External links
Works by Károly Brocky

People from Speyer
1808 births
1855 deaths
19th-century Hungarian painters
Hungarian male painters
19th-century Hungarian male artists